Salada can refer to:

Places
 Laguna Salada, a municipality (municipio) of the Valverde province in the Dominican Republic
 Laguna Salada (Mexico)
 Saladas, Corrientes, a town in Corrientes Province, Argentina
 Saladas Department, a department of Corrientes Province in Argentina

Other
 Salada Paulista, a bi-monthly magazine
 Salada tea, a manufacturer of tea
 Salada (biscuit), savoury cracker produced by Arnotts of Australia